Ethan Edward Hayter (born 18 September 1998) is a British racing cyclist, who currently rides for UCI WorldTeam .

Career
Hayter started riding at Herne Hill Velodrome in 2012, aged 13. He raced for the VC Londres cycling club from 2012 to 2016, and remains an honorary member. In 2016 he joined British Cycling's Senior Academy squad, relinquishing his A-level studies in order to join the programme.

He rode in the men's team pursuit event at the 2018 UCI Track Cycling World Championships, winning a gold medal. In August 2018 it was reported that Hayter had joined  as a stagiaire until the end of the year. That month he also competed at the European Track Championships in Glasgow, where he took bronze medals as part of the British team pursuit squad, the Madison pairing alongside Oliver Wood and an individual gold in the omnium.

Personal life
As of 2021 he was living in Manchester with fellow cyclist Fred Wright.

Major results

Road

2016
 1st Kuurne–Brussels–Kuurne Juniores
 2nd Overall Trofeo Karlsberg
 2nd Overall Junior Tour of Wales
 2nd Gent–Wevelgem Junioren
 2nd Guido Reybrouck Classic
2017
 7th Gran Premio di Poggiana
2018
 4th Time trial, National Under-23 Championships
 UCI World Under-23 Championships
5th Time trial
8th Road race
 5th Overall Ronde de l'Oise
2019
 National Under-23 Championships
1st  Road race
2nd Time trial
 1st  Overall Paris–Arras Tour
1st  Young rider classification
1st Stage 2
 Giro Ciclistico d'Italia
1st  Points classification
1st Prologue & Stage 1
 1st Stage 3 Tour de l'Avenir
 5th Road race, National Championships
 8th Overall Orlen Nations Grand Prix
 10th London–Surrey Classic
2020
 1st Giro dell'Appennino
 2nd Memorial Marco Pantani
 3rd Giro della Toscana
 9th Coppa Sabatini
2021
 National Championships
1st  Time trial
1st  Circuit race
3rd Road race
 1st  Overall Tour of Norway
1st Stages 1 & 2
 2nd Overall Tour of Britain
1st  Points classification
1st Stages 3 (TTT) & 5
 2nd Overall Volta ao Algarve
1st Stage 2
 4th Overall Settimana Internazionale di Coppi e Bartali
1st  Young rider classification
1st Stage 3
 4th Bretagne Classic
 7th Overall Vuelta a Andalucía
1st  Points classification
1st Stages 2 & 5
 8th Time trial, UCI World Championships
2022
 1st  Time trial, National Championships
 1st  Overall Tour de Pologne
 Tour de Romandie
1st  Points classification
1st Prologue & Stage 2
 Settimana Internazionale di Coppi e Bartali
1st  Points classification
1st Stage 2
 1st Stage 2 Tour of Norway
 4th Overall Volta ao Algarve
 UCI World Championships
4th Time trial
9th Road race
 Vuelta a España
Held  after Stages 1–4

Grand Tour general classification results timeline

Track

2015
 National Junior Championships
1st  Individual pursuit
1st  Madison (with Fred Wright)
2nd Scratch
2016
 1st  Madison (with Joe Holt), National Championships
 National Junior Championships
1st  Individual pursuit
3rd Madison
 UEC European Junior Championships
1st  Team pursuit
2nd  Omnium
 3rd  Team pursuit, UCI Junior World Championships
2017
 National Championships
1st  Madison (with Matt Walls)
1st  Scratch
2nd Omnium
2nd Points
2nd Team pursuit
3rd Individual pursuit
 UEC European Under-23 Championships
1st  Team pursuit
2nd  Points
 1st Six Days of Berlin Under-23 (with Matt Walls)
2018
 1st  Team pursuit, UCI World Championships
 UEC European Championships
1st  Omnium
3rd  Team pursuit
3rd  Madison (with Oli Wood)
 UEC European Under-23 Championships
1st  Madison (with Matt Walls)
1st  Omnium
 Commonwealth Games
2nd  Team pursuit
3rd  Points
 National Championships
1st  Team pursuit
2nd Points
2019
 National Championships
1st  Omnium
1st  Scratch
 UCI World Championships
2nd  Team pursuit
3rd  Omnium
 3rd  Team pursuit, UEC European Championships
2021
 UCI World Championships
1st  Omnium
3rd  Team pursuit
 2nd  Madison (with Matt Walls), Olympic Games
2022
 UCI World Championships
1st  Team pursuit
1st  Omnium
2nd  Madison (with Oli Wood)
 UCI Nations Cup, Milton
1st Omnium
2nd Madison (with Rhys Britton)

References

External links
 
 
 
 
 
 
 
 

1998 births
Living people
British male cyclists
Cyclists from Greater London
UCI Track Cycling World Champions (men)
Cyclists at the 2018 Commonwealth Games
Commonwealth Games silver medallists for England
Commonwealth Games medallists in cycling
British track cyclists
European Championships (multi-sport event) gold medalists
Olympic cyclists of Great Britain
Cyclists at the 2020 Summer Olympics
Medalists at the 2020 Summer Olympics
Olympic medalists in cycling
Olympic silver medallists for Great Britain
Sportspeople from Manchester
21st-century British people
Medallists at the 2018 Commonwealth Games